Velma Louise Gaines Hamock (May 25, 1910 – October 3, 2000) was an American funeral home owner in Paducah, Kentucky. In 1949 she inherited the business, at one time the only African-American owned funeral home in the city, after the death of her husband A. Z. Hamock. She is noted for having kept the mummy of Speedy Atkins, which her husband had preserved in 1928, for more than 40 more years before burial in 1994. About 200 people attended the 1994 funeral and burial of Atkins in Maplelawn Cemetery in Paducah. As had her husband, Velma Hamock kept Atkins' preserved body in a closet when it was not displayed to tourists. She died in October 2000.

References

External links
 

1910 births
2000 deaths
People from Paducah, Kentucky
Businesspeople from Kentucky
African-American businesspeople
Persons involved with death and dying
20th-century American businesspeople
20th-century American businesswomen
Kentucky businesswomen
20th-century African-American women
20th-century African-American people